The 2016−17 Bulgarian Cup was the 35th official edition of the Bulgarian annual football knockout tournament. The competition began on 20 September 2016 with the first round and finished with the final on 24 May 2017. CSKA Sofia were the defending champions, but lost in the first round to Lokomotiv Sofia. Botev Plovdiv won its third cup, after winning the final against Ludogorets Razgrad. Botev, thus, qualified for the first qualifying round of the 2017–18 UEFA Europa League.

Participating clubs
The following 32 teams qualified for the competition:

Matches

Round of 32
The draw was conducted on 7 September 2016. The games were played between 20 and 22 September 2016. On this stage all of the participants started their participation i.e. the 14 teams from First League, the 14 non-reserve teams from Second League and the 4 winners from the regional amateur competitions.

Round of 16
The draw was conducted on 27 September 2016. The games were played between 25 and 27 October 2016. On this stage the participants will be the 16 winners from the first round.

Quarter-finals
The draw was conducted on 2 November 2016. The games will be played between 4 and 6 April 2017. On this stage the participants will be the 8 winners from the second round.

Semi-finals
The draw was conducted on 7 April 2017. The first legs will be played on 18 and 19 April and the second legs are scheduled for 26 and 27 April 2017.

First legs

Second legs

Final

Bracket

Top goalscorers

Notes

References

Bulgarian Cup seasons
Bulgarian Cup
Cup